Burma competed at the 1952 Summer Olympics in Helsinki, Finland.

Boxing

Men

Weightlifting

Men

References
Official Olympic Reports

Nations at the 1952 Summer Olympics
1952
1952 in Burmese sport